The following television stations broadcast on digital channel 8 in Mexico:
 XHBUAP-TDT in Puebla, Puebla
 XHCPAF-TDT in Puerto Vallarta, Jalisco
 XHTEH-TDT in Tehuacán, Puebla
 XHUS-TDT in Hermosillo, Sonora

08